Mirellia is a genus of air-breathing land snails, terrestrial pulmonate gastropod mollusks in the family Streptaxidae.

Distribution 
The distribution of the genus Mirellia includes:
 East Africa

Species
Species within the genus Mirellia include:

References

Streptaxidae